African floods can refer to: 

2007 African floods
2009 West Africa floods